Yury Nikolayevich Kokhanets (born 15 February 1972) is a Russian speed skater. He competed at the 1998 Winter Olympics, the 2002 Winter Olympics and the 2006 Winter Olympics.

References

External links
 

1972 births
Living people
Russian male speed skaters
Olympic speed skaters of Russia
Speed skaters at the 1998 Winter Olympics
Speed skaters at the 2002 Winter Olympics
Speed skaters at the 2006 Winter Olympics
Sportspeople from Astana